Heteroteucha is a genus of moths of the family Oecophoridae.

Species
Heteroteucha anthodora  (Meyrick, 1884)
Heteroteucha asema  (Turner, 1917)
Heteroteucha aspasia  (Meyrick, 1884)
Heteroteucha dichroella  (Zeller, 1877)
Heteroteucha dimochla  (Turner, 1944)
Heteroteucha distephana  (Meyrick, 1884)
Heteroteucha epistrepta  (Turner, 1940)
Heteroteucha initiata  (Meyrick, 1920)
Heteroteucha kershawi  (Lower, 1893)
Heteroteucha leptobaphes  (Turner, 1944)
Heteroteucha occidua  (Meyrick, 1884)
Heteroteucha ophthalmica  (Meyrick, 1884)
Heteroteucha paraclista  (Meyrick, 1913)
Heteroteucha parvula  (Meyrick, 1884)
Heteroteucha porphyryplaca  (Lower, 1893)
Heteroteucha rhoecosema  (Turner, 1941)
Heteroteucha rhoecozona  (Turner, 1946)
Heteroteucha stereomita  (Turner, 1944)
Heteroteucha subflava  (Turner, 1944)
Heteroteucha translatella  (Walker, 1864)
Heteroteucha tritoxantha  (Meyrick, 1886)
Heteroteucha xanthisma  (Turner, 1917)

References

Markku Savela's ftp.funet.fi

 
Oecophorinae
Moth genera